Glendale Boulevard is a north–south street in Los Angeles. It starts off as Lucas Avenue at 7th Street west of Downtown Los Angeles, California.

Background
The name changes at Beverly Boulevard in Echo Park, north of the Hollywood Freeway (Route 101) at Bellevue Avenue.  State Route 2 runs from Alvarado Street until the freeway entrance north of Allesandro Street.

Northeast of Riverside Drive and Interstate 5, it merges with Hyperion Avenue, forming the Glendale-Hyperion Bridge over the Los Angeles River.

As it passes underneath the train tracks of the Metrolink, it enters Glendale and changes to Brand Boulevard, a principal north–south thoroughfare in Glendale, marking the west–east postal divider of that city that finally ends at Kenneth Road.

Transit
Metro Local line 92 operates on Glendale Boulevard.

References

Streets in Los Angeles
Streets in Los Angeles County, California
Transportation in Glendale, California
Echo Park, Los Angeles
Boulevards in the United States